Exudative hyponychial dermatitis is a nail toxicity common during chemotherapy for breast cancer, especially if docetaxel is the chemotherapeutic regimen.

See also
Skin lesion
 List of cutaneous conditions

References

External links 

 

Drug eruptions